Dinah the Pink Dinosaur (sometimes referred to as Dinah the Dinosaur) is a  tall anthropomorphized statue of a dinosaur, located in just off Main Street (US-40) in Vernal, Utah, United States.

Background
The statue weighs  and is composed of pink fiberglass. It was originally built in 1958 to hold a sign for the Dine-A-Ville Motel and served this purpose until the motel went out of business and was demolished. It was later moved to a city park in the eastern part of town and now holds a sign welcoming visitors that reads "Vernal—Utah's Dinosaur Land".

References

External links

 Roadside Wonders
 Deseret News - Dinah the Dino Moves to New Vernal Home

Outdoor sculptures in Utah
Dinosaur sculptures
Fiberglass sculptures in Utah
1958 sculptures
1958 establishments in Utah
Statues in Utah